Ljubljana Graphic School is an internationally known group of artists whose art developed with Ljubljana Biennial of Graphic Arts and local Academy of Fine Arts in Ljubljana.

The informal beginnings of the Ljubljana school of graphic arts are linked to the year 1955 and the first international graphic arts exhibition (later biennial). The endeavour for high technical perfection of the graphic print mainly carried out in the techniques of etching and aquatint, the precision and the aspiration for the independence of printmaking as a medium were the main features of the group.

It still is Slovenia's most successful art brands that have established themselves on the international art scene.

Arts in Slovenia
Culture in Ljubljana